The Brusselator is a theoretical model for a type of autocatalytic reaction.
The Brusselator model was proposed by Ilya Prigogine and his collaborators at the Université Libre de Bruxelles. 

It is a portmanteau of Brussels and oscillator.

It is characterized by the reactions

Under conditions where A and B are in vast excess and can thus be modeled at constant concentration, the rate equations become

where, for convenience, the rate constants have been set to 1.

The Brusselator has a fixed point at

.

The fixed point becomes unstable when

leading to an oscillation of the system. Unlike the Lotka–Volterra equation, the oscillations of the Brusselator do not depend on the amount of reactant present initially. Instead, after sufficient time, the oscillations approach a limit cycle.

The best-known example is the clock reaction, the Belousov–Zhabotinsky reaction (BZ reaction). It can be created with a mixture of potassium bromate , malonic acid , and manganese sulfate  prepared in a heated solution of sulfuric acid .

See also
Lotka–Volterra equation
Oregonator

References

Non-equilibrium thermodynamics
Chaotic maps
Oscillators
Ordinary differential equations